Libellula is a genus of dragonflies, commonly called skimmers, in the family Libellulidae, distributed throughout the temperate zone of the Northern Hemisphere. Most species are found in the United States, where they are the best-known large dragonflies, often seen flying over freshwater ponds in summer. Many have showy wing patterns.

Overview
The taxa Ladona (corporals) and Plathemis (whitetails) have been considered as synonyms of Libellula, subgenera, or separate genera by different authorities.  Recent phylogenetic analysis has supported their status as either subgenera or full genera.

Species
List of species.

Extant species

Ladona

Plathemis

Fossils
Libellula brodieri† 
Libellula calypso† 
Libellula doris †
Libellula eusebioi† 
Libellula kieseli† 
Libellula martini† 
Libellula melobasis†
Libellula pannewitziana† 
Libellula perse† 
Libellula sieboldiana† 
Libellula thetis† 
Libellula thoe† 
Libellula ukrainensis†

References

External links

Libellulidae
Anisoptera genera
Odonata of Asia
Odonata of Europe
Odonata of North America
Odonata of South America
Taxa named by Carl Linnaeus
Taxa described in 1758
Animal migration